The 1985 Air Force Falcons football team represented the United States Air Force Academy in the 1985 NCAA Division I-A football season. The Falcons came within one victory of playing for the national championship. After beating the Texas Longhorns in the Bluebonnet Bowl, the Falcons ended the year 12–1 and ranked #8 in the country.

Schedule

Roster

Rankings

Season summary

No. 15 Notre Dame

Army

at BYU

vs. Texas (Bluebonnet Bowl)

Team players in the NFL
Sophomore Chad Hennings' rookie season in the NFL was in 1992 with the Dallas Cowboys.

Awards and honors
Pat Malackowski, Bullard Award

References

Air Force
Air Force Falcons football seasons
Western Athletic Conference football champion seasons
Bluebonnet Bowl champion seasons
Air Force Falcons football